The 1978 Villanova Wildcats football team represented the Villanova University during the 1978 NCAA Division I-A football season. The head coach was Dick Bedesem, coaching his fourth season with the Wildcats. The team played their home games at Villanova Stadium in Villanova, Pennsylvania.

Schedule

References

Villanova
Villanova Wildcats football seasons
Villanova Wildcats football